"New" is a song by American singer Daya. The song was released on October 11, 2017. It was written by Daya with Brett "Leland" McLaughlin, James Newman and the producers Sir Nolan and StarGate.

The song is the first song to be released under Interscope Records after Daya’s split from her independent label Artbeatz.

Music video
The music video was released on October 12, 2017 and was directed by Tobias Nathan.

Charts

Certifications

Release history

References

2017 singles
2017 songs
Songs written by Tor Erik Hermansen
Songs written by Mikkel Storleer Eriksen
Songs written by Leland (musician)
Songs written by Sir Nolan
Song recordings produced by Stargate (record producers)
Interscope Records singles
Daya (singer) songs
Songs written by James Newman (musician)
Songs written by Daya (singer)